The Textile Museum Sarawak is a textile museum in Kuching, Sarawak, Malaysia.

History
The museum building was originally built in 1907 as medical center. It was then later housed the Education Department of Sarawak State Government. In August 2000, it was eventually turned into the Textile Museum Sarawak.

Architecture
The museum is housed in a 3-story building with colonial British renaissance theme named the Pavilion Building. The upper two floors house the permanent exhibition.

Exhibitions
The museum displays the textiles made by local communities in Sarawak, as well as traditional costumes and accessories. It also showcases the stages of textile manufacturing processes.

See also
 List of museums in Malaysia

References

2000 establishments in Malaysia
Buildings and structures in Kuching
Museums established in 2000
Museums in Sarawak
Textile museums